Cyamops funkae is a species of fly.

References

funkae
Insects described in 2000